Lev Vladimir Goriansky  (1894–1967) also known as LVG, was a Russian Empire naval officer, American architect and artist.

Early life

Goriansky was born in Kharkov, Ukraine, the second son of six children (Uri, Lev, Nicholas, Olga, Alexis, Benjamin) to Vladimir Goriansky and Anna Savitch. His father was an engineer and later appointed by Emperor Nicholas II as President of the Chamber of Control in Poltava. His mother's family was titled and owned a large country estate in the Ukraine.

From an early age Goriansky was gifted and excelled in drawing. In 1910 at the age of sixteen he entered a competition to study for two years at the Imperial Academy of Arts in St. Petersburg and was accepted. While studying art at school he lived with his uncle, Dr. Goriansky who had an apartment in the Winter Palace adjacent to the Hermitage Museum, allowing the young student time to investigate and appreciate many of the great works of the world.

Naval officer

In 1914 at the beginning of World War I, Goriansky entered the Russian Naval Academy to train as an officer. Upon graduation he was assigned to the Russian cruiser Rurik (1892) of the Baltic Fleet.  During the upheavals of the 1917 Russian Revolution, and after a murderess mutiny aboard his ship, Goriansky made his way towards Poland where he was stopped and placed into a detention camp. He would later manage to escape and return home to Kharkov before it fell in the revolution. He bid his parents farewell, and joined the loyal Black Sea Fleet in Sebastopol, where he would serve aboard the cruiser Kagoul as a lieutenant under Admiral Osteletsky. During his travels in the Navy he made a stop in Constantinople, where he visited Haghia Sophia, which he would later write about. While stationed in Bizerte, he took the opportunity to board an American freighter and work his way to America, which would become his new home.

Architect

Nicholas Roerich gave Goriansky his first job in America by helping remodel an old brownstone house which would become the Nicholas Roerich Museum. Roerich would later recommend Goriansky enrolling in the Massachusetts Institute of Technology, which he did in January 1922 and received his B.S. in Architecture in January, 1924. He found two good friends while studying there in Prof. William Emerson and Prof. Jacques Carlu, a French professor of art and design. While working part-time at Cram & Ferguson, Goriansky continued studying at MIT for his master's degree in architecture, which he received in 1925.

With Cram & Ferguson he worked on the designs for the walls of the Baptistry of Cathedral of St. John the Divine. By 1929 he was working with Cross & Cross in New York City. Notable projects of that period include working on the City Bank-Farmers Trust skyscraper in Manhattan, New York (20 Exchange Place) and being instrumental in the exterior design of the upper half of the building and the concept of the flat top, among the first in NYC. At the time of completion it was the tallest stone clad building in the world.

In 1955, Goriansky designed a family summer home at Pebble Beach, on Peabody Drive, in Northeast Harbor, Maine.

Artist

With the onset of the Great Depression, Goriansky's professional career as an architect would come to a close. He would spend 1932-1934 studying at Harvard and receiving his master's in Fine Arts, and then traveling, studying, and sketching in Europe between 1934 and 1936. Between 1936 and 1956 he worked as a professional artist drawing and painting a diverse body of work. Ranging from spiritual and biblical themes, to still lifes, landscapes, figure studies and architectural renderings, signing his works LVG.

During this period he published:

 1938 - The Fine Arts: Some Thoughts on Higher Education: A Resume of Personal Experience and Investigations, Search for Truth. La Merite Francaise, Paris (prize). 
 1941 - Haghia Sophia: Research in the Line of Dynamic Philosophy as to the Nature of the Great Enigma. (Andhra Research University Pamphlets, Vizianagaram City, South India).

Works

Personal life

In 1927 in New York City, Goriansky married Carola Eliot from Brookline, Massachusetts. She was the daughter of Charles Eliot and Mary Yale Pitkin from Philadelphia (1865–1946); the marriage produced two sons. In 1942 the couple purchased 148 Main Street in Andover Massachusetts, where the family lived until 1990.

References

Further reading

Museum links

 Farnsworth Art Museum
 Worcester Art Museum
 Harvard Art Museums

MIT School of Architecture and Planning alumni
Harvard University alumni
1894 births
1967 deaths
Imperial Russian Navy personnel
Imperial Academy of Arts alumni
20th-century American painters
20th-century American architects
White Russian emigrants